The English actress Glenda Jackson has achieved notability since beginning her performing career in 1952. She took a hiatus from acting from 1992 to 2015, after being elected as the Labour Party MP for Hampstead and Highgate. Following her departure from Parliament, she has made a successful return to performing. Her acting work encompasses stage, radio, film and television. In addition, she has also narrated and presented various campaign films. The list does not include works in which Jackson only appears as an interviewee, rather than a performer, such as chat shows.

Jackson has won the Triple Crown of Acting, the term used for actors who have won a competitive Academy Award, Emmy Award and Tony Award in the acting categories – the highest accolades recognised in American film, television, and theatre, respectively. She is one of only nine living women who have achieved this feat. She has also been nominated for, and received, numerous other awards.

Filmography

Film

Television

Short films

Stage

Audio

Radio

Recordings

References

External links
 
 Glenda Jackson on BBC Genome

Actress filmographies
British filmographies